The 1955 North Texas State Eagles football team represented North Texas State College—now known as the University of North Texas—as a member of the Gulf Coast Conference (GCC) during the 1955 college football season. Led by tenth-year head coach Odus Mitchell, the Eagles compiled an overall record of 5–4–1 with a mark of 2–1 in conference play, sharing the GCC title with Abilene Christian. North Texas State's game against Chattanooga on November 5 counted in the conference standings even though Chattanooga was not a member of the GCC.

Schedule

References

North Texas State
North Texas Mean Green football seasons
North Texas State Eagles football